The 1892–93 season was the first season in the history of Newcastle United after the merger of Newcastle East End and Newcastle West End. The club started the season as Newcastle East End, taking the name Newcastle United during December. They participated in the Northern League, the only season they have not competed in The Football League, finishing in second place behind Middlesbrough Ironopolis. They also competed in the FA Cup, but lost in the first round to Middlesbrough.

Appearances and goals

Competitions

League

FA Cup

Friendlies

Matches

League

 * Newcastle played this game with ten men, as Joseph McKane missed the train and failed to turn up. The match was also delayed by 45 minutes as the rest of the team arrived late.

FA Cup

Friendlies

References

External links
Newcastle United - Historical Football Kits
Season Details - 1892-93 - toon1892

Newcastle United F.C. seasons
Newcastle United